Monarthrum scutellare is a species of ambrosia beetle.

References

Scolytinae